Community College Leadership and Administration: Theory, Practice, and Change (2010) is a College and University Administration textbook by Dr. J Luke Wood and published by Peter Lang.

Reception 
The Community College Leadership and Administration textbook is a #7 bestseller on Barnes and Nobles in the category of College and University Administration, and has been ranked #6 in Economic Theory on Amazon as of 2014.

References

2010 non-fiction books
Academic administration
Economics textbooks